Feasel is a surname. Notable people with the surname include:

Grant Feasel (1960–2012), American football player
Greg Feasel (born 1958), American football player